The Professional Lacrosse League (PLL) was a men's professional indoor lacrosse league in the United States. It was announced in 2012 with its inaugural season scheduled to begin in September 2012. The league originated in a split with the North American Lacrosse League (NALL). The league ended after a year, in 2013.

History
The Professional Lacrosse League developed out of a rift in the North American Lacrosse League, which was originally scheduled to start play with five teams in January 2012. Weeks before the NALL season was to start, four of the teams – the Charlotte Copperheads, the Hershey Haymakers, the Jacksonville Bullies, and the Wilkes-Barre/Scranton Shamrocks – announced that the NALL had relieved acting Commissioner Anthony Caruso of duty and would be switching from a winter to a fall schedule. In turn, Caruso responded that his removal was illegitimate and that he remained in charge of the NALL, which would keep to the winter schedule. The dispute went to litigation, with the result that winter faction kept the NALL name and branding, while the fall faction formed the PLL.

Brett Vickers was announced as PLL League President. The league  was supposed to start play with four teams in September 2012, however, the Haymakers and Shamrocks franchises have not secured arena leases and are currently searching for new locations.

On July 11, 2012 the Commissioner Brett Vickers announced on Twitter "@PLLcommissioner I love throwing people off by setting up websites." & "Heading South..........had two great meetings in the two new PLL cities Wednesday and yesterday. Excited about September!"  Adding speculation that New Jersey may not be the league's newest member.

On August 28, Brett Vickers resigned from the PLL.

On September 6, 2012, New Jersey Rascals CEO announced "It is with a heavy heart that we announce the New Jersey Rascals will not be playing this season. We believe it is in the best interest of our fans, the Sun National Bank Center, our corporate partners and sponsors to take another year to explore the many ways that we can build on the great momentum we are seeing in the Mercer County area." With the loss of the Rascals, the 2012 PLL season was in serious jeopardy.  The Rascals tried to become a charter member of the failed United States Lacrosse League.

Teams

Former teams

See also 
 List of professional sports teams in the United States and Canada

References 

 
2012 establishments in the United States
Defunct professional sports leagues in the United States
Sports leagues established in 2012